Krisna is a genus of leafhoppers in  the family Cicadellidae. There are more than 30 described species in Krisna.

Species

Krisna antaea Linnavuori & Quartau, 1975
Krisna bakeri Viraktamath, 2006
Krisna colorata Baker, 1919
Krisna concava Li & Wang, 1991
Krisna daiyunensis Zhang, Zhang & Dai, 2008
Krisna delta Viraktamath, 2006
Krisna furcata Zhang, Zhang & Dai, 2008
Krisna gravis (Stål, 1858)
Krisna indicata (Walker,1858)
Krisna kirbyi Kirkaldy, 1900
Krisna magna Baker, 1919
Krisna megha Viraktamath, 2006
Krisna minima Baker, 1919
Krisna muirii  Baker, 1919
Krisna nigrifrons Baker, 1919
Krisna nigromarginata Cai & He, 1998
Krisna olivacea Linnavuori, 1969
Krisna olivascens Baker, 1919
Krisna penangensis Baker, 1919
Krisna raja Viraktamath, 2006
Krisna rosea (Bierman, 1910)
Krisna rufimarginata Cai & He, 1998
Krisna sherwilli Distant, 1908
Krisna simillima Baker, 1919
Krisna straminea (Walker, 1851)
Krisna strigicollis (Spinola, 1850)
Krisna varia Viraktamath, 2006
Krisna veni Viraktamath, 2006
Krisna villiersi Linnavuori, 1969
Krisna viraktamathae Zhang, Zhang & Dai, 2008
Krisna viridula Li & Wang, 1991
Krisna walayari Viraktamath, 2006
Krisna walkeri Metcalf, 1955

References

Cicadellidae
Hemiptera genera